Sandy Hook is a home rule-class city beside the Little Sandy River in Elliott County, Kentucky, in the United States. The population was 675 at the 2010 census.

Sandy Hook is the county seat of Elliott County, which is a dry county. It is illegal to sell alcohol within the city.

History
The head of navigation on the Little Sandy River was first settled in the 1820s. By the time of its establishment by the state legislature in 1850, it was known as "Sandy Hook" for the fishhook-shaped bend in the river at that point.

It was chosen as the seat of the newly established Elliott County over nearby Newfoundland in 1869, owing to a generous donation of land for public buildings by resident James Hunter. In 1872, the city was incorporated as "Martinsburg" in honor of Congressman John P. Martin. The priority of another Martinsburg, Kentucky, meant that the post office (est. 1874) had to be named "Sandy Hook". The city resumed the name shortly after and was reincorporated as "Sandy Hook" in 1888.

Geography
Sandy Hook is located near the center of Elliott County at  (38.092447, −83.123918) at the head of navigation on the Little Sandy River in eastern Kentucky.

Kentucky Route 7 passes through the center of town, leading northeast  to Grayson and southwest  to West Liberty. Kentucky Route 32 leads east  to Louisa and heads north out of Sandy Hook with KY 7, eventually leading northwest  to Morehead.

Demographics

As of the census of 2000, there were 678 people, 292 households, and 167 families residing in the city. The racial makeup of the city was 99.26% White, 0.15% African American, 0.15% Native American, and 0.44% from two or more races.

There were 292 households, out of which 27.1% had children under the age of 18 living with them, 36.0% were married couples living together, 18.8% had a female householder with no husband present, and 42.8% were non-families. 41.8% of all households were made up of individuals, and 18.5% had someone living alone who was 65 years of age or older. The average household size was 2.13 and the average family size was 2.90.

In the city, the population was spread out, with 23.5% under the age of 18, 8.4% from 18 to 24, 22.1% from 25 to 44, 20.8% from 45 to 64, and 25.2% who were 65 years of age or older. The median age was 42 years. For every 100 females, there were 65.0 males. For every 100 females age 18 and over, there were 60.2 males.

The median income for a household in the city was $14,313, and the median income for a family was $21,071. Males had a median income of $40,417 versus $22,031 for females. The per capita income for the city was $13,278. About 28.2% of families and 31.2% of the population were below the poverty line, including 43.1% of those under age 18 and 26.4% of those age 65 or over.

Education
Sandy Hook has a lending library, the Rocky J. Adkins Public Library.

Notable person 
Sandy Hook is the hometown of late country music singer Keith Whitley. A statue of Whitley playing his guitar can be seen in the local cemetery, and a local street was renamed "Keith Whitley Boulevard." Whitley's body is buried in the Spring Hill Cemetery in Nashville, Tennessee.

References

 

Cities in Elliott County, Kentucky
Cities in Kentucky
County seats in Kentucky
Populated places established in 1850
1850 establishments in Kentucky